Illustrious Corpses is a 1976 Italian-French thriller film directed by Francesco Rosi and starring Lino Ventura, based on the novel Equal Danger by Leonardo Sciascia (1971). The film was screened at the 1976 Cannes Film Festival, but was not entered into the main competition.

Its title refers to the surrealist game, Cadavre Exquis, invented by André Breton, in which the participants draw consecutive sections of a figure without seeing what the previous person has drawn, leading to unpredictable results, and is meant to describe the meandering nature of the film with its unpredictable foray into the world of political manipulations, as well as the ("illustrous") corpses of the murdered judges.

In 2008, the film was selected to enter the list of the 100 Italian films to be saved.

Plot
The film starts with the murder of Investigating Judge Vargas in Palermo, amongst a climate of demonstrations, strikes and political tension between the Left and the Christian Democratic government. The subsequent investigation failing, the police assign Inspector Rogas (Lino Ventura), a man with a firm faith in the integrity of the judiciary, to solve the case. While he is starting his investigation, two judges are killed. All victims turn out to have worked together on several cases. After Rogas discovers evidence of corruption surrounding the three government officials, he is encouraged by superiors "not to forage after gossip," but to trail the "crazy lunatic who for no reason whatever is going about murdering judges." This near admission of guilt drives Rogas to seek out three men wrongfully convicted by the murdered judges. He is joined by a journalist friend working for a far-left newspaper, Cusan.

Rogas finds his likely suspect in Cres, a man who was convicted of attempting to kill his wife. Mrs. Cres accused her husband of trying to kill her by poisoning her rice pudding, which she escaped only because she fed a small portion first to her cat, who died. Rogas concludes that he was probably framed by his wife, and seeks him out, only to find that he has disappeared from his house. Meanwhile another investigating judge is killed, and eyewitnesses see two young revolutionaries running away from the scene. Rogas, close to finding his man, is demoted, and told to work with the political division to pin the crimes on the revolutionary Leftist terrorist groups.

Rogas discovers that his phone is tapped. He seeks out the Supreme Court's president (Max von Sydow) in order to warn him that he is most likely the next victim. The president details a philosophy of justice wherein the court is incapable of error by definition. Music from a party in the same building leads to Rogas discovering the Minister of Justice (Fernando Rey) at the party with many revolutionary leaders, amongst them the editor of the revolutionary paper Cusan is working for, Galano, and Mrs. Cres. He and the Minister have a discussion, where the Minister reveals that sooner or later, his party will have to form a coalition with the Communist Party, and that it will be their task to prosecute the far-leftist groups. The murder of the judges as well as Rogas's investigations help raise the tension and justify the prosecution of the far-left groups. Rogas also discovers that his suspect, Cres, is present at the party. Rogas meets with the Secretary-General of the Communist Party in a museum. Both of them are killed. Amongst rising tensions between revolutionaries and the government, which mobilizes the army, the murder of the Secretary-General is blamed on Rogas by the chief of police. The film ends with a discussion between Cusan and the vice-secretary of the Communist Party, who claims that the time is not yet ready for the revolution and the party will not react to the government's actions. "But then the people must never know the truth?", asks Cusan. The vice-secretary answers: "The truth is not always revolutionary." It is a sardonic concluding comment on the strategy at the time of the 'historic compromise' with Christian Democracy adopted by the Communist party, referring back to the motto 'To tell the truth is revolutionary' adopted from Ferdinand Lassalle by Antonio Gramsci, the party's most famous former leader and author of the Prison Notebooks.

Cast
 Lino Ventura as Inspector Amerigo Rogas
 Tino Carraro as Chief of Police
 Marcel Bozzuffi as The lazy
 Paolo Bonacelli as Dr. Maxia
 Alain Cuny as Judge Rasto
 Maria Carta as Madame Cres
 Luigi Pistilli as Cusan
 Tina Aumont as The prostitute
 Renato Salvatori as Police Commissary
 Paolo Graziosi as Galano
 Anna Proclemer as Nocio's wife
 Fernando Rey as Security Minister
 Max von Sydow as Supreme Court president
 Charles Vanel as Varga

Release

Critical response
The film triggered a lot of controversy at its release, especially for the joke pronounced in the last part of the film by the communist party secretary "Truth is not always revolutionary", which is used by Rosi to denote the silence of the opposition to the prevailing and much often unpunished corruption.

Illustrious Corpses was presented, out of competition, at the 1976 Cannes Film Festival. The same year, it received the David di Donatello for Best Film, at the same time as Francesco Rosi was awarded the David di Donatello for Best Director.

See also
Equal Danger, the novel by Leonardo Sciascia on which this film is based. 
 List of Italian films of 1976

References

External links

1976 films
1970s psychological thriller films
1970s Italian-language films
Italian political thriller films
Police detective films
1970s political thriller films
Films directed by Francesco Rosi
Films based on works by Leonardo Sciascia
Films about the Sicilian Mafia
Films set in Rome
United Artists films
Films based on Italian novels
Films with screenplays by Tonino Guerra
Films produced by Alberto Grimaldi
Films scored by Piero Piccioni
1970s Italian films